The Queen of FCW title was a women's professional wrestling title in Florida Championship Wrestling (FCW, since re-branded to NXT); it was contested in their Divas division. Title holders would wear a crown rather than a championship belt that is primarily used in professional wrestling. The title was active for over three years, before being deactivated in March 2012, leaving the FCW Divas Championship as the sole title contested for in the Divas division. Raquel Diaz was the final title holder.

Inaugural championship tournament
FCW Divas tournament to determine the inaugural Queen of FCW, won by Angela.

Reigns

See also
FCW Divas Championship

References

WWE women's championships
Florida Championship Wrestling championships